PLE may refer to:
 Photoluminescence excitation
 Pittsburgh and Lake Erie Railroad, P&LE
 Polymorphous light eruption, a skin condition caused by sunlight
 Public legal education
 Protein losing enteropathy

See also

 Plé, the surname